The 2013 World Men's Handball Championship was the 23rd World Men's Handball Championship, an international handball tournament that took place in Spain from 11 to 27 January 2013.  This was the first time Spain hosted the World Men's Handball Championship, becoming the twelfth country to host the competition.

Spain won the title, beating Denmark in the final 35–19. It was Denmark's second final in a row.

Venues 
Games in Madrid were scheduled to be played in the Madrid Arena but on 1 November 2012, five young people were killed in a human stampede during a Halloween party.  The venue was subsequently closed because of the judicial investigation and the IHF changed the location of games to Caja Mágica.

Broadcasting rights

 – Belarus 2
 – TV Esporte Interativo
 – HRT
 – DR, TV 2, TV3 Sport 1
 – Canal+, Canal+ Sport, Sport+
 – ARD, ZDF, Sport1, Sport1+
 – Sport 1
 – Stöð 2 Sport
 – Setanta Sports (later stages)
 – Sitel TV
 – RTCG2
 – TVP
 – Sport TV
 – Al Jazeera Sports (for the Arab countries in the Near East and North Africa)
 – Dolce Sport, Dolce Sport 2, Dolce Sport HD
 – NTV Plus
 – RTS
 – RTV Slovenija, Šport TV
 – Teledeporte
 – TV4
 – beIN Sport

Qualification tournaments

Qualified teams
The qualification for the 2013 World Handball Championship took place in the calendar years of 2011 and 2012. As the host nation, Spain and as defending champions, France were automatically qualified for the tournament.

1 Bold indicates champion for that year
2 Italics indicates host for that year
3 From both German teams only East Germany was qualified in 1990

Draw
The draw took place on 19 July 2012 in Madrid, Spain.

Seeding
The pots were announced on 9 July 2012.

Match officials
16 match official pairs were selected for the tournament.

Squads

Preliminary round
The draw was held on 19 July 2012. The playing schedule was published on 5 August 2012. The throw-off times were published on 12 September 2012.

Twenty-four participating teams were placed in the following four groups. After playing a round-robin, the top four teams in each group advanced to the eighth-finals. The last two teams in each group will play placement matches.

Tie-breaking criteria
For the three game group stage of this tournament, where two or more teams in a group tied on an equal number of points, the finishing positions will be determined by the following tie-breaking criteria in the following order
 number of points obtained in the matches among the teams in question
 goal difference in the matches among the teams in question
 number of goals scored in the matches among the teams in question (if more than two teams finish equal on points)
 goal difference in all the group matches
 number of goals scored in all the group matches
 drawing of lots

All times are (UTC+1).

Group A

Group B

Group C

Group D

Spain's 51–11 win over Australia has been the third highest scoring win at a world championship.

President's cup

17–20th place

Bracket

Semifinals

19th place game

17th place game

21–24th place

Bracket

Semifinals

23rd place game

21st place game

Knockout stage

Bracket

Round of 16

Quarterfinals

Semifinals

Third place game

Final
The final match, watched by 19,500 people, was played at the Palau Sant Jordi hall in Barcelona. Denmark entered the final as the only unbeaten team during the tournament, having won all eight matches they previously played. Host nation Spain won seven of their eight matches before the final, losing only to Croatia in the final match in the group phase.

Spain won their second World Men's Handball Championship, beating Denmark 35–19. While in the early minutes of the game the teams were closely matched, Spain played tough defense, limited Denmark's scoring chances and went on a scoring run to end the first half leading 18–10. The Spanish team then increased their lead in the second half, outscoring Denmark 17–9 to close out the game. It was the third World Championship final that Denmark lost, having also been defeated in 1967 and 2011.

Statistics

Final ranking

Teams 9 to 16 and 5 to 8 are ranked first by points, then by goal difference, then by plus goals from the preliminary round games against teams placed 1 to 4.

All-Star Team
All-Star Team of the tournament:
Goalkeeper: 
Left wing: 
Left back: 
Playmaker: 
Pivot: 
Right back: 
Right wing:

Other awards
Most Valuable Player:

Top goalscorers

Source: IHF.info

Top goalkeepers

Source: IHF.info

References

External links

 
 IHF website

World Men's Handball Championship
World Men's Handball Championship
2013
2013 Men
January 2013 sports events in Europe